Johnny Mattias Munkhammar (24 September 1974 – 13 August 2012) was a Swedish political writer and blogger.

He was an entrepreneur and author of several books. Until he died, he was a member of parliament in Sweden for the Moderate Party.

Previously, he worked for the free market think tank Timbro. He previously worked as a senior adviser at the Confederation of Swedish Enterprise.

Munkhammar was born in Hultsfred in Kalmar County, but grew up in Visby on Gotland. He received a master's degree in political sciences from Uppsala University in 1998. He has worked as an editorial writer at papers such as Nerikes Allehanda och Gotlands Tidningar.

Munkhammar was a board member of the Liberal Youth of Sweden, the youth wing of the Liberal People's Party, from 1996 to 1999. He ran as a candidate for the party in the 1995 and 1999 elections to the European Parliament. During the 2003 euro referendum in Sweden he was a leading campaigner on the pro-euro side.

Munkhammar expressed support to work politically for personal liberty, a free economy, open borders and limited government.

He died of adenoid cystic cancer on 13 August 2012 at the age of 37.

Bibliography
 European Dawn: After the Social Model (Timbro, 2005).
 The guide to reform: How policymakers can pursue real change, achieve great results and win re-election (Timbro, 2007), .

References

External links 
 munkhammar.org – official website

Swedish political writers
Liberals (Sweden) politicians
Uppsala University alumni
Swedish bloggers
Swedish libertarians
1974 births
2012 deaths
People from Gotland
Deaths from cancer in Sweden
Deaths from adenoid cystic carcinoma